Peter Cowley (born 1955, Kingston-upon-Hull, England) is a tech entrepreneur, angel investor and speaker based in Cambridge, United Kingdom. He is Investment Director at Martlet, the Corporate Angel division of Marshall of Cambridge. and was President of the European Business Angel Network (EBAN)

Career 
Among the technology and property development businesses he has founded are Camdata, and Ept Computing, which was acquired by Redgate Software in 2009.

Cowley has invested in over 75 technology startups and was chair of the Cambridge Angels. He is President Emeritus of the European Business Angels Network EBAN and a board member of the Global Business Angels Network (GBAN), part of Global_Entrepreneurs_Network.

A member of the Investment Committee of the Angel CoFund, a £100 million UK Government-backed fund for supporting and growing British SMEs. and the board of the UK Business Angels Association, where he was awarded UK Angel of the Year in 2014.

A Fellow in Entrepreneurship at the Cambridge Judge Business School, Cowley is also a council member of the Cambridge Computer Lab Ring, and chair of supporters and a member of the Steering Committee of ideaSpace, the Cambridge University incubator.

Education 
After gaining a MA in Engineering and Computer Science from Fitzwilliam College, Cambridge University, Cowley gained qualifications from the Open University and Association of Chartered Certified Accountants.

Authorship
In 2018, Peter Cowley authored a book on angel investment titled The Invested Investor.

References 

Angel investors
Living people
British businesspeople
Private equity and venture capital investors
Alumni of Fitzwilliam College, Cambridge
1955 births